= Gajadharpur =

Coordinates: 28.5801°N 79.1755°E

Gajadharpur is a village in Garwara, Uttar Pradesh, India.
